Chai Biao (born 10 October 1990) is a Chinese professional badminton player. Chai has concentrated on men's doubles for the majority of his senior career in badminton. His most successful partnership was with Hong Wei: together they reached the year end tournament BWF Superseries Finals in 2014 and 2015. As Hong has since retired, Chai's current partner in men's doubles is Wang Zekang.

Career 
Chai was born in Yanfeng District of Hengyang City in 1990. At the age of 7, he learned badminton from the senior coach of the Badminton Institute in the City Sports School. Due to progressing quickly, he was transported to Hunan Badminton Team for professional training for four years later. He has won the National Junior Championship. In 2007, he was enter the national badminton team, and at that year in the early of July, he competed at the Asian Junior Championships and won the boys' doubles title. In November, Chai won a gold in the mixed team event and a silver in the boys' doubles event at the World Junior Championships. In 2008, Chai repeat his success at the World Junior Championships in Pune, India, by winning two golds in the mixed doubles and team event and a silver in the boys' doubles event. Chai was a bronze medalist at the Asia Championships in the men's doubles event in 2009 and 2012.

Achievements

BWF World Championships 
Men's doubles

Asian Championships 
Men's doubles

East Asian Games 
Men's doubles

BWF World Junior Championships 
Boys' doubles

Mixed doubles

Asian Junior Championships 
Boys' doubles

BWF Superseries 
The BWF Superseries, which was launched on 14 December 2006 and implemented in 2007, was a series of elite badminton tournaments, sanctioned by the Badminton World Federation (BWF). BWF Superseries levels were Superseries and Superseries Premier. A season of Superseries consisted of twelve tournaments around the world that had been introduced since 2011. Successful players were invited to the Superseries Finals, which were held at the end of each year.

Men's doubles

  BWF Superseries Finals tournament
  BWF Superseries Premier tournament
  BWF Superseries tournament

BWF Grand Prix 
The BWF Grand Prix had two levels, the Grand Prix and Grand Prix Gold. It was a series of badminton tournaments sanctioned by the Badminton World Federation (BWF) and played between 2007 and 2017.

Men's doubles

Mixed doubles

  BWF Grand Prix Gold tournament
  BWF Grand Prix tournament

Record against selected opponents 
Men's doubles results with Guo Zhendong against Superseries Finals finalists, World Championships semifinalists, and Olympic quarterfinalists.

  Cai Yun & Fu Haifeng 1–2
  Liu Xiaolong & Qiu Zihan 2–0
  Fang Chieh-min & Lee Sheng-mu 2–0
  Mathias Boe & Carsten Mogensen 0–5
  Mads Conrad-Petersen & Jonas Rasmussen 3–1
  Mads Conrad-Petersen & Mads Pieler Kolding 1–0
  Muhammad Ahsan & Bona Septano 4–1
  Hendra Aprida Gunawan & Alvent Yulianto 0–2
  Markis Kido & Hendra Setiawan 1–1
  Angga Pratama & Ryan Agung Saputra 2–1
  Hiroyuki Endo & Kenichi Hayakawa 0–1
  Hirokatsu Hashimoto & Noriyasu Hirata 4–0
  Goh V Shem & Lim Khim Wah 0–1
  Hoon Thien How & Tan Wee Kiong  0–1
  Koo Kien Keat & Tan Boon Heong 0–1
  Vladimir Ivanov & Ivan Sozonov 1–1
  Cho Gun-woo & Shin Baek-cheol 0–1
  Jung Jae-sung & Lee Yong-dae 2–1
  Ko Sung-hyun & Yoo Yeon-seong 2–1
  Bodin Isara & Maneepong Jongjit 2–0
  Howard Bach & Tony Gunawan 0–2

References

External links 
 

1990 births
Living people
People from Hengyang
Badminton players from Hunan
Chinese male badminton players
Badminton players at the 2012 Summer Olympics
Badminton players at the 2016 Summer Olympics
Olympic badminton players of China